Tarabrin is a Russian masculine surname, its feminine counterpart is Tarabrina. Notable people with the surname include:

Alexandr Tarabrin (born 1985), Kazakhstani swimmer
Anatoly Tarabrin (1934–2008), Russian rower
Dmitri Tarabrin (born 1976), Russian ice hockey player

References

Russian-language surnames